Claire Pitollat (born 17 September 1979) is a French engineer and politician who has represented the 2nd constituency of the Bouches-du-Rhône department in the National Assembly since 2017. A member of La République En Marche! (LREM), her constituency encompasses the 7th and 8th arrondissements of Marseille.

Early life 
Claire Pitollat was born and grew up in the 7th arrondissement of Marseille. She attended the school of La Roseraie, then the Lycée Montgrand. After studying physical science in Marseille, she graduated in Toulouse from the aeronautical engineering school SUPAERO. During this time, she also earned her private pilot's license.

Political career 
In the 2017 legislative election, she succeeded Dominique Tian of The Republicans (LR) in Parliament as a political newcomer. She was elected for La République En Marche! in the 2nd constituency of Bouches-du-Rhône with 54.7% of the vote in the second round. She joined the Committee on Social Affairs.

In September 2019, Pitollat was designated to hold one of the vice presidencies of the La République En Marche group in the National Assembly alongside Bénédicte Peyrol, but only remained in that position for a few months. In the 2020 municipal election in Marseille, she supported without result the establishment of an electoral alliance with The Republicans led by Martine Vassal.

In the 2022 legislative election, she was reelected with 61.6% of the second-round vote. In the 16th National Assembly under the Fifth Republic, she joined the Committee on Sustainable Development, Spatial and Regional Planning.

References

Living people
1970s births
Politicians from Marseille
La République En Marche! politicians
Deputies of the 15th National Assembly of the French Fifth Republic
Deputies of the 16th National Assembly of the French Fifth Republic
Members of Parliament for Bouches-du-Rhône
Women members of the National Assembly (France)
21st-century French women politicians
French engineers